Blessed Sacrament Cathedral is the mother church of the Roman Catholic Diocese of Greensburg in Greensburg, Pennsylvania.  In 1999 it was included as a contributing property in the Academy Hill Historic District.

History
This is the third church at this location. The parish was founded in 1789 as Most Holy Sacrament. That year, a log cabin was begun for the parish church. It was replaced in 1846 by a brick structure. The parish was placed under the supervision of the Order of Saint Benedict from Saint Vincent Archabbey at that time.

The present church was constructed in the English Gothic style. It was designed by the Pittsburgh architectural firm of Comes, Perry and McMullen. It was dedicated in May 1928, and is constructed of sandstone and Indiana limestone. The massive appearance of the church building is typical of those found in northern Europe. The stained glass windows were created by Franz Mayer & Co. of Munich, Germany.

The parish was designated Blessed Sacrament Cathedral with the establishment of the Diocese of Greensburg on March 10, 1951, at which time the Benedictines relinquished pastoral responsibility. Maria Celli of the architectural firm Celli-Flynn & Associates redesigned the interior in 1971 to conform to liturgical changes that resulted from the Second Vatican Council.  The same firm redesigned the rectory in the 1980s. From 2010 to 2011 the interior of the cathedral was restored. Celli-Flynn Brennan Architects and Planners of Pittsburgh served as the architects, the designs were provided by EverGreene Architectural Arts of New York City, and Volpatt Construction Corp. of Pittsburgh was the general contractor.

See also
List of Catholic cathedrals in the United States
List of cathedrals in the United States

References

External links 

Official Cathedral Site
Roman Catholic Diocese of Greensburg Official Site

Religious organizations established in 1789
1789 establishments in Pennsylvania
Roman Catholic churches completed in 1928
Greensburg, Pennsylvania
Churches in Westmoreland County, Pennsylvania
Roman Catholic Diocese of Greensburg
Roman Catholic cathedrals in Pennsylvania
Gothic Revival church buildings in Pennsylvania
Churches on the National Register of Historic Places in Pennsylvania
Historic district contributing properties in Pennsylvania
National Register of Historic Places in Westmoreland County, Pennsylvania
20th-century Roman Catholic church buildings in the United States